Les arts florissants (H. 487) is a short chamber opera (also described by the composer as ) in five scenes by Marc-Antoine Charpentier.

History
It was written in 1685 for the group of musicians employed by Marie de Lorraine, Duchess of Guise, at her residence in Paris. The reason behind the creation of this work, as well as its place of performance, remain a matter for speculation. The French libretto, written by an unknown author, is allegorical in nature and draws on aspects of mythological and natural symbolism familiar to 17th-century audiences to add depth to a superficially simple plot.

After a brief struggle in which Discord and his Furies gain the upper hand, Peace appeals to Jupiter to intervene on her behalf. Discord and his followers are chased back into Hades by a hail of thunderbolts, and Peace holds sway once more.

Analysis
The opera is scored for seven solo voices, five-part chorus, two flutes (or recorders), two treble viols and basso continuo.

The instrumentalists are included in the original character list under the entry , and the overture is labelled  (for the orchestral players in Music's following).

Roles

Selected recordings
Charpentier: Les Arts Florissants H.487 / William Christie, Les Arts Florissants. CD Harmonia Mundi 1982 report Musique D'abord 1987.
Charpentier: les Arts Florissants H.487, La Couronne de Fleurs H.486, (excerpts) / Gaétan Jarry, Ensemble Marguerite Louise. CD Château de Versailles spectacles 2017/2018.
Charpentier : Les Arts Florissants H.487, Les Plaisirs de Versailles  H.480, Teresa Wakim, Jesse Blumberg, Virginia Warnken, Boston early Music Festival Vocal & Chamber Ensembles / Paul O’Dette, Stephen Stubbs. CD CPO 2019.

Bibliography
Marc-Antoine Charpentier: "Les Arts florissans", Marc-Antoine Charpentier: Œuvres complètes, ser.I vol.7 (facs.), ed. H. Wiley Hitchcock (Paris: Minkoff France, 1996) 120-164
Marc-Antoine Charpentier, H. Wiley Hitchcock, Oxford University press 2001. Also in Grove Music online.
Shirley Thompson, New perspectives on Marc-Antoine Charpentier, New York, routledge, 2010/2016, 600 p.

Notes

Sources
H. Wiley Hitchcock: "Marc-Antoine Charpentier 1. Life", Grove Music Online ed. L. Macy (Accessed August 25, 2006), www.grovemusic.com (subscription access)
John S. Powell: "Les Arts florissants", Grove Music Online ed. L. Macy (Accessed August 25, 2006), www.grovemusic.com (subscription access)

External links
 Patricia M. Ranum: "The 'Guise Music': some thumbnail sketches of the members of Mlle de Guise's ensemble", Ranums' Panat Times website (Accessed August 25, 2006), www.ranumspanat.com/guise_music.html 

French-language operas
Chamber operas
Operas by Marc-Antoine Charpentier
1685 operas
Operas